Madelyn Scales Harris is an American politician and Vice Mayor of Murfreesboro, Tennessee. She was elected to the Murfreesboro, Tennessee City Council in 2010, re-elected in 2014, and elected for a third term in 2018.

She was selected by her peers to serve as Vice Mayor, the position held by her late father Robert W. Scales, on February 8, 2017.

Her mother Mary Scales was the first black faculty member at Middle Tennessee State University. Her father Robert W. Scales was the first African-American city councilman and first African-American Vice-Mayor of Murfreesboro.

Harris is a graduate of Middle Tennessee State University, and is retired from State Farm Insurance where she worked as a business account underwriter. Her family owns the Scales & Son Funeral Home founded by Preston Scales in 1916 as the first black-owned funeral home in Rutherford County, TN and Murfreesboro.

References

Living people
African-American women in politics
African-American people in Tennessee politics
Middle Tennessee State University alumni
Tennessee city council members
African-American city council members
Year of birth missing (living people)
Women city councillors in Tennessee
People from Murfreesboro, Tennessee
21st-century African-American people
21st-century African-American women